Karppinen is a Finnish surname. Notable people with the surname include:

Klaes Karppinen (1907–1992), Finnish cross-country skier
Mika Karppinen, known as "Gas Lipstick" (born 1971), drummer
Pertti Karppinen (born 1953), Finnish rower
Sami Karppinen, drummer
Timo Karppinen (born 1967), Finnish orienteering competitor
Veikko Karppinen, Finnish ice hockey player

Finnish-language surnames